Boone is an extinct town in Franklin County, in the U.S. state of Missouri.

A post office called Boone was established in 1851, and remained in operation until 1907. The community most likely took its name from Boone Township.

References

Ghost towns in Missouri
Former populated places in Franklin County, Missouri